A special election was held in the U.S. state of Minnesota on December 8, 2015, to elect a new representative for District 3A in the Minnesota House of Representatives, caused by the death of Representative David Dill on August 8, 2015. A primary election was held on September 29, 2015, to nominate a Minnesota Democratic–Farmer–Labor Party (DFL) candidate. Rob Ecklund, the DFL nominee, won the special election.

Candidates

Republican Party of Minnesota
 Roger Skraba, former mayor and city councilor of Ely.

Minnesota Democratic–Farmer–Labor Party
 Rob Ecklund, Koochiching County commissioner.
 Bill Hansen, businessman. Contested the 2002 and 2004 District 6A elections as the DFL endorsed candidate, losing the DFL nomination both times to David Dill.
 Eric Johnson, businessman. Contested the 2014 District 3A election as the Republican nominee.
 Heidi Omerza, Ely city counciler.

Independents
 Kelsey Johnson, lobbyist; director of state affairs for the Grocery Manufacturers Association.

Primary election
The DFL did not hold an endorsing convention that was originally scheduled for September 19. In announcing his decision to cancel the event, Senate District 3 DFL chair Paul Fish said that "[t]he voters of 3A deserve the opportunity to select the DFL candidate who best represents their interests. Therefore, a DFL endorsing convention for the 3A seat will not be held. Participation in the Sept. 29 primary is encouraged." Cook County DFL chair Anton Moody, Lake County DFL chair Marlys Wisch, and St. Louis County DFL chair Kirsten Larsen, whose counties include District 3A, said that they disagreed with the decision, citing a lack of transparency. The decision also upset DFL candidate Bill Hansen, who was considered to be the front-runner for the party endorsement.

Results

Results

Previous election results

See also
 List of special elections to the Minnesota House of Representatives

References

External links
 Information on the special election  at the Minnesota Secretary of State website

2015 Minnesota elections
Minnesota special elections